St Paul's Church, Leicester is a Grade II listed former
parish church in the Church of England in Kirby Road, Leicester, Leicestershire.

History

The foundation stone was laid on 18 May 1870. The church was built to the designs of Frederick Webster Ordish and John Charles Traylen of Mountsorrel granite, banded and interlaid with Derbyshire red gritstone, covered with Swithland grey-green slating. Stone from Box and the Forest of Dean was used in the quatrefoils of the clerestory, and the side and end windows. The windows were fitted with mosaic glass by Evans of Birmingham.

It was consecrated on 1 November 1871.

Organ

The organ dates from 1873 and was by Brindley & Foster. A specification of the organ can be found on the National Pipe Organ Register. When the church was declared redundant, the organ was moved to the Church of the Assumption of St Mary the Virgin, Hinckley, Leicestershire.

Parish status
The church was declared redundant in 2003 and the parish moved to a modern worship centre.

References

Church of England church buildings in Leicester
Grade II listed churches in Leicestershire
Churches completed in 1871
2003 disestablishments in England